Kalokairi Stin Kardia (Greek: Καλοκαίρι Στην Καρδιά; English: Summer in the heart) is the debut extended play by Greek Cypriot singer Ivi Adamou, released in Greece and Cyprus on 14 June 2010 by Sony Music Greece. On 5 November 2010, the second live show of the third season of the Greek The X Factor, where she was a contestant the year before, Adamou received a gold certification from the presenter, Sakis Rouvas, denoting shipments of six thousand copies.

Track listing

Singles
"A*G*A*P*I (Crashing Down)"
"Sose Me (Lights On)"
"To Mistiko Mou Na Vris"

Personnel

Leo "Freakchild" Chantzaras – production, vocal recording, arrangement
Jason Gill – vocal recording, production, arrangement, programming, mixing, guitar, keys 
Dimitris Stasos – vocal recording, production, guitar
Alex Papaconstantinou – production, arrangement, programming, guitar, keys
Theodoros Darmas – production, arrangement, vocal recording, programming, keys
Fotios Stefos – vocal recording, production, arrangement
Mikaela Stenstrom – background vocals
Elena Patraklou – vocal coach, background vocals
Thomas Lindberg  – bass
Erik Arvinder with friends – strings
Adam Baptiste – background vocals
Moh Denebi – mixing
Aris Binis – vocal recording, mixing
Bjorn Engelman – mastering
Hendrik Eilers – mixing, mastering
Spiros Kontakis – guitar  
Thomas Lindberg – bass
Giannis Grigoriou – bass
Alkis Misirlis – drums
Antonis Glikos – artwork
Charlie Makkos – photography
Giannis Giannaridis (effex+) – grooming
Giannis Trakas – styling
Mirto Ganou – photo editing

Certifications

References

2010 debut EPs
Greek-language albums
Sony Music Greece EPs
Ivi Adamou albums